Daniel Condren (born 13 April 1995), better known as RTGame (channel also known as RTGameCrowd), is an Irish-Canadian YouTuber and live streamer. He is known for his humorous commentary during gameplay, and often plays games in unorthodox or mischievous ways. He began making videos in 2011, began streaming in 2016, and experienced a surge in popularity in 2018. , his YouTube channel has over 2.7 million subscribers, while his Twitch channel has over 1.1 million followers.

Early life
Condren was born in Ireland on 13 April 1995, the son of an Irish father and Canadian mother. He holds dual Irish and Canadian citizenship. He studied at Trinity College in Dublin, where he earned a bachelor's degree in English literature in November 2017. While studying there, he was a part of a gaming society, where he won a Mario Kart tournament and earned the title of "the Drift King". The title of 'Drift King' is still in use as a popular meme amongst Condren and his subscribers.

Career
Condren created his YouTube channel on 13 August 2011 and uploaded his first video, a Terraria Let's Play, five days later. In 2012, he started making videos on the game Team Fortress 2, which lasted until 2018 when he switched to making variety content.

In early 2018, Condren moved to Tokyo to pursue a career as an English teacher. However, his YouTube and Twitch channels unexpectedly skyrocketed in popularity shortly before he began teaching, and he decided to forego the job in order to dedicate his time to streaming, editing, and publishing videos. The most notable videos from this time were on the games The Sims 3, Planet Coaster, and Cities: Skylines. He moved back to Ireland in the summer of 2018, and his YouTube channel hit 1 million subscribers several weeks later. In December 2018, he joined Yogscast's annual charity event Jingle Jam, where he helped raise $3.3 million.

Since 2020, Condren has employed Chloe as a video editor to help with his YouTube channel, as often ‘shouted out’ in his streams. His most notable videos have included organising Minecraft building sessions for his Twitch subscribers, spending 13 days (and an in-game time of 2 days) searching for a shiny Wooloo in Pokémon Sword and Shield, and knocking out every NPC in the Hitman 3 level of Sapienza in order to stuff them all into a meat freezer and kill the entire population with a single shot into an explosive canister (which ultimately failed when the bodies formed a "meat shield"). Condren also notably aired a Mario Kart stream dedicated to the character Daisy in aid of an Irish cancer charity .

In December 2022, YouTube age-restricted some of his videos. Condren claimed the platform was "retroactively restricting videos that violate recent policy changes." The updated guidelines gained visibility when he made a video on the topic, with Youtube set to revise the policy after being criticised for its poor communication regarding these changes.

Personal life
Condren's lung collapsed in 2015, and he continues to have issues with it .

See also
 List of most-followed Twitch channels

References

1995 births
Alumni of Trinity College Dublin
Living people
Irish YouTubers
Twitch (service) streamers 
Gaming YouTubers
YouTube channels launched in 2011